Panama competed at the 1992 Summer Olympics in Barcelona, Spain.

Competitors
The following is the list of number of competitors in the Games.

Results by event

Athletics
Men's 100m metres
Florencio Aguilar
 Heat — 10.89 (→ did not advance)

Swimming
Men's 100m Breaststroke
 Rafael Torres Arguelles
 Heat – 1:06.05 (→ did not advance, 41st place)

Men's 200m Breaststroke
 Rafael Torres Arguelles
 Heat – 2:21.93 (→ did not advance, 34th place)

Men's 200m Individual Medley
 Rafael Torres Arguelles
 Heat – 2:12.01 (→ did not advance, 41st place)

See also
Panama at the 1991 Pan American Games

References

Official Olympic Reports

Nations at the 1992 Summer Olympics
Olympics
1992